Yu-Gi-Oh! is a 1998 Japanese anime television series based on the manga of the same name written and illustrated by Kazuki Takahashi. It was the first anime adaptation of the manga series and it was produced by Toei Animation and directed by Hiroyuki Kakudō. The series tells the story of Yugi Mutou, who after solving the ancient Millennium Puzzle, awakens a gambling alter-ego within his body that solves his conflicts using various games. This series loosely adapts the first 59 chapters of the manga while adding original events and characters not present in the manga.

The series was broadcast on TV Asahi from April 4, 1998 to October 10, 1998 and was followed by a theatrical movie released on March 6, 1999.


Episode list

Home video releases

References

Yu-Gi-Oh!